She of the Mountains is a 2014 novel by Vivek Shraya that interweaves a story of the Hindu deities, Parvati, Shiva and Ganesh with a queer Hindu boy growing up in Canada.

Reception
Quill & Quire in a starred review of She of the Mountains wrote "Vivek Shraya seamlessly blends a lyrical interpretation of Hindu mythology with a contemporary coming-of-age tale. .. Studded with abstract illustrations by Raymond Biesinger, Shraya’s book is accessible, yet complex. "

She of the Mountains has also been reviewed by Publishers Weekly, Kirkus Reviews, and The Globe and Mail.

References

2014 Canadian novels
Canadian LGBT novels
Gay male literature
2010s LGBT novels
Books by Vivek Shraya
Arsenal Pulp Press books
2014 LGBT-related literary works